Russell "Silver" McCrimmon (March 1, 1890 – June 24, 1934) was a Canadian professional ice hockey player. He played with the Edmonton Eskimos of the Western Canada Hockey League in the 1921–22 season.

Earlier, as an amateur, he played in Pittsburgh with the Duquesne Garden and Pittsburgh Athletic Association hockey teams.

He died on June 24, 1934 after being taken to jail following an automobile accident. His death was ascribed to suicide by hanging.

References

External links

1890 births
1934 deaths
Edmonton Eskimos (ice hockey) players
Pittsburgh Athletic Association ice hockey players
Sportspeople from Kawartha Lakes
Canadian ice hockey right wingers
People who committed suicide in prison custody
Suicides by hanging in Pennsylvania
Canadian expatriate ice hockey players in the United States
Canadian people imprisoned abroad
Canadian people who died in prison custody
Prisoners who died in Pennsylvania detention